Roman Pungartnik (born 16 May 1971) is a Slovenian handball player. He competed in the men's tournament at the 2000 Summer Olympics.

References

1971 births
Living people
Slovenian male handball players
Olympic handball players of Slovenia
Handball players at the 2000 Summer Olympics
Sportspeople from Celje